Vancouver Island was a federal electoral district in British Columbia, Canada, that was represented in the House of Commons of Canada from 1871 to 1874. It was created when the province of British Columbia joined Confederation in 1871.

Like other ridings established in that year, a by-election was called to fill the seat until the general election of 1872.  The riding was composed of all those parts of the former Crown Colony of Vancouver Island and adjoining islands and islets, excluding the area around the capital, Victoria District.  The 1871 names were all temporary pending ratification of the riding system by the provincial legislature.  In 1872, this riding was abolished, and replaced by Vancouver riding.

Election results 
Note: Winners of each election are in bold.

|-
 
|Conservative
|Robert Wallace
|align="right"|137
|align="right"|57.32%

|- bgcolor="white"
!align="right" colspan=3|Total valid votes
!align="right"|239
|- bgcolor="white"
!align="right" colspan=7|1  By-elections were held to fill the temporary seats created when British Columbia joined Confederation.  General elections were not held until the following year.
|}

See also 

 List of Canadian federal electoral districts
 Past Canadian electoral districts

External links 
Elections Canada historical returns for BC ridings in 1871

Defunct British Columbia federal electoral districts on Vancouver Island